Stari Mikanovci railway station is a railway station on Novska–Tovarnik railway. Located in Stari Mikanovci. Railroad continued to Strizivojna–Vrpolje in one and the other direction to Ivankovo. Stari Mikanovci railway station consists of 5 railway track.

See also 
 Croatian Railways
 Zagreb–Belgrade railway

References 

Railway stations in Croatia